Ficus exasperata, also called the sandpaper tree, forest sandpaper fig, white fig, or sandpaper leaf tree, is a deciduous, and dioecious species of plant in the mulberry family Moraceae, native to tropical Africa (an area from Senegal east to Ethiopia and south to Angola and Mozambique) and southern Asia (India, Sri Lanka, Yemen).

Description
The trunk develops aerial and buttressing roots to anchor it in the soil and help support heavy branches. It has almost distichous and alternate which are almost opposite, simple; blade ovate to elliptical or obovate; base acute to obtuse; apex shortly acuminate, acute or obtuse; and margin toothed to entire. Flowers are unisexual and are pink, purplish, or yellow, becomes orange or red at maturity.

Growth and Development
Fruit is a syconium and trees may be either female or hermaphrodite. Hermaphrodite trees are functionally male. The tree is known to pollinated by the wasp Kradibia gestroi, where the female lays eggs in female trees with only short-styles. Besides sexual reproduction, the tree may grow with vegetative means propagated by seed and cuttings.

Uses
Sandpaper tree is widely used as a source of sandpaper and as a valuable medicinal plant. Extracts from the tree are used for their anti-ulcer, hypotensive, lipid-lowering, analgesic, anti-inflammatory and antipyretic properties.

References

External links

Antiarthritic and antioxidant effects of the leaf extract of Ficus exasperata P. Beauv. (Moraceae)

exasperata
Ornamental trees
Trees of Africa
Flora of India (region)
Flora of Sri Lanka
Flora of Yemen
Dioecious plants